Hathoway Slough is a  long second-order tributary to Big Springs Creek (South Branch Verdigre Creek tributary) in Antelope County, Nebraska.

Course
Hathoway Slough rises on the Elkhorn River divide about 1 mile east of Orchard, Nebraska in Antelope County and then flows northeast and northwest to join Big Springs Creek about six miles [CONVERT]north-northeast of Orchard, Nebraska.

Watershed
Hathoway Slough drains  of area, receives about 26.3 in/year of precipitation, has a wetness index of 555.68, and is about 2.24% forested.

See also

List of rivers of Nebraska

References

Rivers of Antelope County, Nebraska
Rivers of Nebraska